Leonid Kostyantynovych Kadenyuk (28 January 1951 – 31 January 2018) was the first astronaut of independent Ukraine who flew into outer space. He flew on NASA's Space Shuttle Columbia in 1997 as part of the international mission STS-87. Kadenyuk held the rank of major general in the Ukrainian Air Force. He was Deputy of Ukraine of the 4th convocation, People's Ambassador of Ukraine, Hero of Ukraine, President of the Aerospace Society of Ukraine, Adviser to the Prime Minister of Ukraine and Chairman of the State Space Agency of Ukraine, Honorary Doctor of Chernivtsi National University.

Biography 
Leonid Kadenyuk was born on 28 January 1951 in the village of Klishkivtsi, Khotyn district, Chernivtsi region in a family of rural teachers.

In 1967, after graduating from high school with a silver medal, he entered the Chernihiv Higher Military Aviation School of Pilots.

After graduating from the Aviation School in 1971 and receiving a diploma of a pilot-engineer in the specialty "Piloting and operation of aircraft" he worked as a pilot-instructor.

Kadenyuk was a Soviet military pilot. He began his service in the Soviet Air Forces and was selected in 1976 for the Soviet Cosmonaut Corps.  In 1977 he graduated from the Test Pilot Training Center. He received a diploma and qualification "test pilot".  In 1977–1979, he underwent general space training and qualified as a test astronaut.

Between 1984 and 1988 Kadenyuk was a test pilot of the State Research Institute of the USSR Air Force.  In 1989 he graduated from the Moscow Aviation Institute – Faculty of Aircraft.  Between 1988 and 1990 he underwent engineering and flight training in the Buran program as commander of the planned Soviet reusable spacecraft.  He was removed from a team of test pilots of Buran due to marital issues. He was allowed to rejoin the Cosmonaut Detachment several years later.  He took part in working out the glide path of descent for landing the spacecraft Buran using MiG-31 and MiG-25 aircraft.

Between 1990 and 1992, under the full program, he was trained as the commander of the transport ship Soyuz-TM.

With the break-up of the Soviet Union, Kadenyuk remained in the Russian Space Forces and adopted Ukrainian citizenship. In 1995, during the preparation of the first Ukrainian space mission, he volunteered to take part and returned to his homeland.

In 1995 he was selected to the group of astronauts of the National Space Agency of Ukraine.

Preparing for space flight, from April to October 1996 he worked as a researcher at the Department of Phytohormonology of the Kholodny Institute of Botany of the National Academy of Sciences of Ukraine.

He was trained by NASA for a space flight on the US reusable spacecraft Columbia, mission STS-87, as a payload specialist. There were two main candidates for the mission, the other being Yaroslav Pustovyi, a civil Ukrainian scientist in space research. As the more experienced one, Kadeniuk was chosen as the primary candidate for the mission, and Pustovy became Kadenyuk's backup.

From 19 November to 5 December 1997, he made a space flight on the American Space Shuttle Columbia, mission STS-87.

After the flight, Leonid Kadeniuk continued his Ukrainian space program career in the State Space Agency of Ukraine.

During the preparation for space flights and in the process of test work he underwent unique engineering and flight training. He studied the Soyuz, Soyuz-TM, Buran spacecraft, the Salyut orbital station, the Mir orbital complex, and the US Space Shuttle.

He participated in the development and testing of aerospace systems, in their sketch and layout design, as well as in flight tests of systems.

He flew more than 50 types and modifications of aircraft for various purposes, mainly on fighters, as well as on the American training aircraft Northrop T-38.

During the preparation for space flights he was trained to conduct scientific experiments on board spacecraft in various fields: biology, medicine, metrology, ecology, study of natural resources of the Earth from space, geology, astronomy, geobotany.

Kadenyuk was appointed Major general of the Armed Forces of Ukraine in 1998 and became Deputy Inspector General of the General Military Inspectorate under the President of Ukraine for Aviation and Cosmonautics.

In the 2002 parliamentary election, he was elected to the Verkhovna Rada in the list of pro-Kuchma United Ukraine Bloc. Later, Kadeniuk joined the "Trudova Ukrayina – Industrialists and Entrepreneurs" faction, but had not been politically active. He worked within parliament's Committee on Defense and National Security.

In the 2006 parliamentary election, Kadenyuk was No. 3 in the electoral party list of Lytvyn's People's Bloc, but the block won only 2.44% of the popular vote (short of the required 3%) and no seats in the parliament.

Kadenyuk is the author of 5 scientific papers.

The book "Mission – Space", published in 2009 by Pulsary Publishing House, won first place in the Book of the Year 2009 competition in the Horizons category. The book was republished in 2017 by Novy Druk Publishing House.

Interesting Facts

About preparation for space flights 
Skydiving is considered as a kind of simulator – a means of psychological training of astronauts. Leonid Kadenyuk says "Frankly speaking, I never had a passionate love for jumping. I made them because it was required."

About the spacecraft "Columbia" 
Construction of "Columbia" began in 1975.

During its existence, "Columbia" has made 28 flights:

 The first flight took place on 12 April 1981;
 The 24th flight took place with the participation of Leonid Kadenyuk on 19 November 1997;
 The 28th flight was the last – a crash during the return to Earth, the destruction of the shuttle and the death of the crew – on 1 February 2003.

Flight with Columbia 
The space shuttle was launched on 19 November 1997 from the space center. John F. Kennedy, Florida. In the laboratory module "Spacelab" scientific experiments in the fields of astrobiology, physics and materials science were carried out, astronauts were also scheduled to go into outer space.

During his flight with shuttle Columbia, he performed biological experiments of a joint Ukrainian-American scientific study with three species of plants: turnip, soybean and moss. The main purpose of the experiments was to study the effect of weightlessness on the photosynthetic apparatus of plants, on fertilization and embryo development, on gene expression in soybean and turnip tissues, on the content of phytohormones in turnip plants, on hydrocarbon metabolism and ultrastructure of soybean sprout cells. pathogenic fungus late blight.

In addition to these experiments in space flight, experiments were performed by the Institute of Systems Human Research on the topic "Man and the state of weightlessness."

Interestingly, on 27 November, the 9th day of the flight, the first connection with Ukraine was scheduled. For the first time from space, a citizen of Ukraine had a dialogue with his country.

From the astronaut's memoirs: "7 days before the launch, a special regime was introduced for our crew in order to prevent infectious diseases – quarantine. It excludes the possibility of astronauts in public places and any outside contacts. We were also isolated from families. At the same time, the astronauts are not only under the close supervision of doctors, but also under the supervision of psychologists."

Leonid Kostyantynovych recalls: "Every free minute I and my colleagues used to observe and photograph the Earth and space. Such classes were the most popular, and I considered them another impressive and extremely interesting experiment aboard the "Columbia" "

The day in Ukraine begins with the Anthem. Therefore, Leonid Kostyantynovych ordered it to signal the awakening of the crew, which was broadcast from the Flight Control Center on board the "Columbia". Each member of the crew chose a melody to their liking. Thus, the anthem of our state twice sounded in space over the entire planet.

Views 
"A state of weightlessness is a physical state that is virtually impossible to create or model in a simulator under the constant action of gravity. In flying laboratory aircraft, it can be created within 25–30 seconds. In orbital flight, it is constant.

"It seemed that there was a struggle between two forces: the forces of nature, which was the earth's gravity and held the ship and did not let go, and the forces of the human mind, represented by the power of the rocket," – quoted from an interview in Igor Sharov's book.

Awards and honors 

Award of the President of Ukraine "Hero of Ukraine" with the award of the Order "Golden Star" – for services to the Ukrainian state in the development of astronautics, outstanding personal contribution to strengthening international cooperation in space.

Distinction of the President of Ukraine – Order "For Courage" I degree – for outstanding contribution to the international prestige of the national space industry, personal courage and heroism shown during the Ukrainian-American scientific research aboard the spacecraft "Columbia" (19 January 1998).

Order "For Merits" III st. – for significant personal contribution to the development of the rocket and space industry, significant achievements in the creation and implementation of space systems and technologies, high professionalism (12 April 2011)

Distinction of the President of Ukraine – Order "For Courage" I degree – for outstanding contribution to the international prestige of the national space industry, personal courage and heroism shown during the Ukrainian-American scientific research aboard the spacecraft "Columbia" (19 January 1998).

Asteroid 399673 Kadenyuk, discovered by astronomers at the Andrushivka Astronomical Observatory in 2004, was named in his honor. The official  was published by the Minor Planet Center on 5 October 2017.

In September 2018 Chernivtsi International Airport was renamed after Kadeniuk.

Death 

Kadenyuk died on 31 January 2018 from a heart attack during his morning run in a park in Kyiv. He was interred in the central avenue of Kyiv's Baikove Cemetery. On 2 February 2018, the farewell ceremony occurred in Kyiv in the Club of Cabinet of Ministers of Ukraine building.

See also 

 Soviet space program
 State Space Agency of Ukraine

References

External links 
  2004 interview with Leonid Kadeniuk in Dzerkalo Tyzhnya weekly
  
 
 
 
 
 
 ДОЛЯ, ЯКОЮ КЕРУЄ БОГ - Зоряні миті Леоніда Каденюка
 
 
 
 
 
 
 

1951 births
2018 deaths
People from Chernivtsi Oblast
State Space Agency of Ukraine personnel
Ukrainian cosmonauts
Ukrainian test pilots
Ukrainian generals
Recipients of the title of Hero of Ukraine
Fourth convocation members of the Verkhovna Rada
Buran program
Burials at Baikove Cemetery
Soviet Air Force officers
Soviet test pilots
Space Shuttle program astronauts
Recipients of the Order of Gold Star (Ukraine)